SS Samfoyle was a Liberty ship built in the United States during World War II. She was transferred to the British Ministry of War Transportation (MoWT) upon completion.

Construction
Samfoyle was laid down on 8 February 1944, under a Maritime Commission (MARCOM) contract, MC hull 2351, by J.A. Jones Construction, Brunswick, Georgia; sponsored by Mrs. Harry A. Debutts, and launched on 23 March 1944.

History
She was allocated to Cunard-White Star Line, on 31 March 1944. On 18 April 1947, she was sold to Cunard-White Star Line, and renamed Vardulia. She was scrapped in 1968.

References

Bibliography

 
 
 
 
 

 

Liberty ships
Ships built in Brunswick, Georgia
1944 ships
Liberty ships transferred to the British Ministry of War Transport